Harry "Fritz" Dorish (July 13, 1921 – December 31, 2000) was an American professional baseball player.  Born in Swoyersville, Pennsylvania, he was a right-handed pitcher over all or parts of ten Major League seasons (1947–56) with the Boston Red Sox, St. Louis Browns/Baltimore Orioles and Chicago White Sox. He was a United States Army veteran of World War II, where he served in the Pacific Theater of Operations.

For his big-league career, he compiled a 45–43 record in 323 appearances, mostly as a relief pitcher, with 48 saves, a 3.83 earned run average and 332 strikeouts. He allowed 850 hits and 301 bases on balls in 834 innings pitched. He stole home plate on the front end of a double steal on June 2, 1950, and is the last American League pitcher to steal home.

Dorish was a scout for the Red Sox, Houston Astros and Cleveland Indians, a minor-league manager, and the pitching coach for the Bosox (1963) and the Atlanta Braves (1968–71) after his 16-year (1941–42; 1946–59) playing career. He died in Wilkes-Barre, Pennsylvania, at the age of 79.

See also
 List of Major League Baseball annual saves leaders

References

External links

 
 Photo

  
  

1921 births
2000 deaths
United States Army personnel of World War II
Atlanta Braves coaches
Baltimore Orioles players
Baseball players from Pennsylvania
Birmingham Barons players
Boston Red Sox coaches
Boston Red Sox players
Boston Red Sox scouts
Canton Terriers players
Chicago White Sox players
Cleveland Indians scouts
Houston Astros scouts
Houston Buffs players
Louisville Colonels (minor league) players
Major League Baseball pitchers
Major League Baseball pitching coaches
Minneapolis Millers (baseball) players
Minor league baseball managers
People from Swoyersville, Pennsylvania
St. Louis Browns players
San Francisco Seals (baseball) players
Scranton Red Sox players
Sportspeople from Pennsylvania